Doc Johnson is an American sex toy company. It was founded in 1976 by Reuben Sturman with Ron Braverman at the helm. It is run by Ron Braverman and his son Chad Braverman.

Overview 
It is one of the largest sex toy companies in the world and they manufacture the majority of their products at their factory in North Hollywood, California. , it employs over 500 people, and has been described by Los Angeles Magazine as "the Procter & Gamble of sex toys".

Product line 
Among its other products, it manufactures products modeled on the anatomy of famous porn actors that include  Jeff Stryker, Jenna Jameson, Jordi El Nino Polla, and Sasha Grey.

References

External links
 
 Amovibe Sex Toy Company website

Sex toy manufacturers
Manufacturing companies based in Los Angeles
North Hollywood, Los Angeles
American companies established in 1976
Manufacturing companies established in 1976
1976 establishments in California